The Marineland of Antibes is a theme park founded in 1970 by Roland de La Poype in Antibes (Alpes-Maritimes), in the French Riviera. Covering 26 hectares, it includes a marine zoological park with dolphinarium, a water park (Aquasplash), a children's play park (Kid's Island), mini golf (Aventure Golf) and a three-star hotel (Marineland Resort). It is the property of the Spanish multinational company Parques Reunidos, whose majority shareholder is the British investment fund Arle Capital Partners. The current director is Arnaud Palu.

It is one of the four French dolphinariums and one of the two European dolphinariums presenting orcas. With 1.2 million visitors in 2014, it's the most visited site in the Provence-Alpes-Côte d'Azur region. The zoological park is one of the most visited in France.

Since 2010, it has been criticised by the opponents to cetacean captivity, who claim that dolphinariums can't assure proper & healthy captivity conditions for that species. They also claim that this leads to more premature mortality of individuals.

History 

On July 25, 2006, the park was sold to the Spanish amusement park group Parques Reunidos for about €75 million.

Animal exhibits

Killer whale show
Marineland holds four orcas: Inouk, Wikie, Moana, and Keijo.

Dolphin show
As of April 2020, Marineland housed a total of 12 bottlenose dolphins. The names of the dolphins are: Malou (F), Sharky (F), Rocky (M), Dam (M), Neo (M), Nala (F), Tux (M), Ania (F), Jo (F), Kai (M), Luà (F), and Ollie (F).

Les Coulisses de l'apprentissage (sea lion show)
A live demonstration of the learning techniques used with all the mammals in the park, in which the seal and sea lion trainers disclose some of the "ropes" for preparing the show, to better understand the basis of the relationship between humans and animals.

The shark tunnel

Polar bears
Marineland is one of few places in Europe where one can see polar bears. As of 2020, there are 4 of them: one female (Flocke) and her 3 babies: Tala (F), Indiana (M), and Yuma (M).

Life under the sea (The tropical aquarium gallery and The touch pool)
The tropical aquarium gallery shows the world of coral reefs, and the touch pool is a chance to touch skates and rays - fish that seem to "fly" in the water.

Pinnipeds
Beaches featuring California sea lions, South American sea lions, black seals, and grey seals.

Aquatic birds
Beaches featuring penguins, pelicans, and flamingos.

Meeting with dolphins
Each session lasts approximately 1 hour, to discover the biology and ecology of dolphins, before approaching the dolphins for 20 minutes under close supervision by trainers on a sunken deck.

Gallery

References

External links

MarineLand website
Orcahome

Zoos in France
Aquaria in France
Organizations based in Provence-Alpes-Côte d'Azur
Tourist attractions in Alpes-Maritimes
Oceanaria
1970 establishments in France
Zoos established in 1970
Parques Reunidos